Allorhynchium is an Indomalayan and Australasian genus of potter wasps.

Species
 Allorhynchium anomalum
 Allorhynchium argentatum
 Allorhynchium brevilineatum
 Allorhynchium carbonarium
 Allorhynchium cariniventre
 Allorhynchium chinense
 Allorhynchium concolor
 Allorhynchium iridipenne
 Allorhynchium laminatum
 Allorhynchium lugubrinum
 Allorhynchium malayanum
 Allorhynchium metallicum
 Allorhynchium obscurum
 Allorhynchium quadrimaculatum
 Allorhynchium quadrituberculatum
 Allorhynchium snelleni
 Allorhynchium violaceipenne
 Allorhynchium vollenhofeni

References

Potter wasps